Neolimonia is a genus of crane fly in the family Limoniidae.

Distribution
Caribbean, North, Central & South America. Only one species (Neolimonia dumetorum) can be found in Europe.

Species
N. amazonica (Alexander, 1920)
N. argenteceps (Alexander, 1912)
N. austera (Alexander, 1950)
N. bimucronata (Alexander, 1938)
N. borinquensis (Alexander, 1950)
N. caribaea (Alexander, 1933)
N. cordillerensis (Alexander, 1913)
N. cuzcoensis (Alexander, 1967)
N. deceptrix (Alexander, 1945)
N. dicax (Alexander, 1941)
N. domballah (Alexander, 1939)
N. dumetorum (Meigen, 1804)
N. eiseni (Alexander, 1912)
N. euryleon (Alexander, 1950)
N. gurneyi (Alexander, 1970)
N. hesione (Alexander, 1950)
N. horrenda (Alexander, 1944)
N. huacapistanae (Alexander, 1941)
N. hyperphallus (Alexander, 1938)
N. immodica (Alexander, 1938)
N. indomita (Alexander, 1938)
N. jamaicensis (Alexander, 1926)
N. lachesis (Alexander, 1942)
N. lawlori (Alexander, 1934)
N. ludibunda (Alexander, 1927)
N. lustralis (Alexander, 1938)
N. macintyrei (Alexander, 1938)
N. onoma (Alexander, 1950)
N. optabilis (Alexander, 1921)
N. pastazicola (Alexander, 1938)
N. porrecta (Alexander, 1950)
N. precipua (Alexander, 1979)
N. quadricostata (Alexander, 1980)
N. rara (Osten Sacken, 1869)
N. remissa (Alexander, 1928)
N. roraimae (Alexander, 1931)
N. sanctaemartae (Alexander, 1930)
N. scabristyla (Alexander, 1968)
N. subdomita (Alexander, 1945)
N. sublustralis (Alexander, 1979)
N. subporrecta (Alexander, 1980)
N. tragica (Alexander, 1946)
N. velasteguii (Alexander, 1938)

References

Limoniidae
Diptera of South America
Diptera of North America
Articles containing video clips
Tipuloidea genera